Arithmetic dynamics is a field that amalgamates two areas of mathematics, dynamical systems and number theory. Classically, discrete dynamics refers to the study of the iteration of self-maps of the complex plane or real line. Arithmetic dynamics is the study of the number-theoretic properties of integer, rational, -adic, and/or algebraic points under repeated application of a polynomial or rational function. A fundamental goal is to describe arithmetic properties in terms of underlying geometric structures.

The following table describes a rough correspondence between Diophantine equations, especially abelian varieties, and dynamical systems:

Definitions and notation from discrete dynamics

Thus  is preperiodic if and only if its orbit  is finite.

Number theoretic properties of preperiodic points

More generally, let  be a morphism of degree at least two defined over a number field . Northcott's theorem says that  has only finitely many preperiodic points in
, and the general Uniform Boundedness Conjecture says that the number of preperiodic points in

The Uniform Boundedness Conjecture is not known even for quadratic polynomials  over the rational numbers . It is known in this case that  cannot have periodic points of period four, five, or six, although the result for period six is contingent on the validity of the conjecture of Birch and Swinnerton-Dyer. Poonen has conjectured that  cannot have rational periodic points of any period strictly larger than three.

Integer points in orbits
The orbit of a rational map may contain infinitely many integers. For example, if  is a polynomial with integer coefficients and if  is an integer, then it is clear that the entire orbit  consists of integers. Similarly, if  is a rational map and some iterate  is a polynomial with integer coefficients, then every -th entry in the orbit is an integer. An example of this phenomenon is the map , whose second iterate is a polynomial. It turns out that this is the only way that an orbit can contain infinitely many integers.

Theorem. Let . Then the orbit  contains only finitely many integers.

Dynamically defined points lying on subvarieties
There are general conjectures due to Shouwu Zhang
and others concerning subvarieties that contain infinitely many periodic points or that intersect an orbit in infinitely many points. These are dynamical analogues of, respectively,  the Manin–Mumford conjecture, proven by Raynaud,
and the Mordell–Lang conjecture, proven by Faltings. The following conjectures illustrate the general theory in the case that the subvariety is a curve.

Conjecture. Let  be a morphism and let  be an irreducible algebraic curve. Suppose that there is a point  such that  contains infinitely many points in the orbit  .

p-adic dynamics
The field of -adic (or nonarchimedean) dynamics is the study of classical dynamical questions over a field  that is complete with respect to a nonarchimedean absolute value. Examples of such fields are the field of -adic rationals  and the completion of its algebraic closure . There are many similarities between the complex and the nonarchimedean theories, but also many differences. A striking difference is that in the nonarchimedean setting, the Fatou set is always nonempty, but the Julia set may be empty. This is the reverse of what is true over the complex numbers. Nonarchimedean dynamics has been extended to Berkovich space, which is a compact connected space that contains the totally disconnected non-locally compact field .

Generalizations

Other areas in which number theory and dynamics interact
There are many other problems of a number theoretic nature that appear in the setting of dynamical systems, including:

 dynamics over finite fields.
 iteration of formal and -adic power series.
 dynamics on Lie groups.
 arithmetic properties of dynamically defined moduli spaces.
 equidistribution and invariant measures, especially on -adic spaces.
 dynamics on Drinfeld modules.
 number-theoretic iteration problems that are not described by rational maps on varieties, for example, the Collatz problem.
 symbolic codings of dynamical systems based on explicit arithmetic expansions of real numbers.

The Arithmetic Dynamics Reference List gives an extensive list of articles and books covering a wide range of arithmetical dynamical topics.

See also
Arithmetic geometry
Arithmetic topology
Combinatorics and dynamical systems

Notes and references

Further reading
 Lecture Notes on Arithmetic Dynamics Arizona Winter School, March 13–17, 2010, Joseph H. Silverman
 Chapter 15 of A first course in dynamics: with a panorama of recent developments, Boris Hasselblatt, A. B. Katok, Cambridge University Press, 2003,

External links
 The Arithmetic of Dynamical Systems home page
 Arithmetic dynamics bibliography
 Analysis and dynamics on the Berkovich projective line
 Book review of Joseph H. Silverman's  "The Arithmetic of Dynamical Systems", reviewed by Robert L. Benedetto

 
Dynamical systems
Algebraic number theory